3rd Artillery Regiment or 3rd Field Artillery Regiment may refer to:
3rd Field Artillery Regiment (United States), U.S. Army unit
3rd Continental Artillery Regiment, American Revolutionary War unit
3rd Field Artillery Regiment, RCA, Canadian military unit
3rd Mountain Artillery Regiment (Italy)
3rd Field Artillery Regiment (Denmark)